Harpalus massarti is a species of ground beetle in the subfamily Harpalinae. It was described by Burgeon in 1935.

References

massarti
Beetles described in 1935